Michael Mailer (born 1964) is an American film producer and director and the oldest son of Beverly Bentley and writer Norman Mailer. He graduated from Harvard in 1987. He has produced over 20 films.  He has five sisters and three brothers. He is the founder and president of Michael Mailer Films. He married Sasha Lazard in 2004 and they have one son, Cyrus. Mailer and Lazard divorced in 2011.

Partial filmography
He was a producer in all films unless otherwise noted.

Film

As director

As an actor

As writer

Miscellaneous crew

Thanks

Television

As an actor

References

External links

1964 births
Living people
American film producers
American people of South African-Jewish descent
Place of birth missing (living people)
Harvard University alumni